The Beverly Dinghy is an American sailing dinghy or rowboat, that was designed by A. Sidney DeWolf Herreshoff and first built in 1953. The boat can be employed as a yacht tender.

Production
The design was built by Cape Cod Shipbuilding in the United States, starting in 1953. A total of 500 boats have been completed, but it is now out of production. The company has indicated that the molds are still available and that production could be restarted in response to a fleet order.

Design
The Beverly Dinghy is a recreational sailboat or rowing dinghy, originally built from wood, but later from fiberglass, with wooden spars and trim. It has a catboat rig, a plumb stem, a vertical transom, a transom-hung rudder controlled by a tiller and a retractable centerboard. The sailing version displaces , while the rowboat model displaces .

The design has two seats mounted across the beam.

See also
List of sailing boat types

References

External links
Official website
Photo of a Beverly Dinghy

Dinghies
1950s sailboat type designs
Sailing yachts
Sailboat type designs by A. Sidney DeWolf Herreshoff
Sailboat types built by Cape Cod Shipbuilding